In mathematics, the 57-cell (pentacontakaiheptachoron) is a self-dual abstract regular 4-polytope (four-dimensional polytope). Its 57 cells are hemi-dodecahedra. It also has 57 vertices, 171 edges and 171 two-dimensional faces. 

The symmetry order is 3420, from the product of the number of cells (57) and the symmetry of each cell (60). The symmetry abstract structure is the projective special linear group, L2(19). 

It has Schläfli symbol {5,3,5} with 5 hemi-dodecahedral cells around each edge.

Perkel graph 

See also 
 11-cell – abstract regular polytope with hemi-icosahedral cells.
 120-cell – regular 4-polytope with dodecahedral cells
 Order-5 dodecahedral honeycomb - regular hyperbolic honeycomb with same Schläfli symbol {5,3,5}. (The 57-cell can be considered as being derived from it by identification of appropriate elements.)

References 
.

.

 The Classification of Rank 4 Locally Projective Polytopes and Their Quotients, 2003, Michael I Hartley

External links 
 Siggraph 2007: 11-cell and 57-cell by Carlo Sequin
 
 Perkel graph
 

4-polytopes